Pennsylvania Route 249 (PA 249) is a  state highway located in Tioga County, Pennsylvania.  The southern terminus is at PA 287 in Middlebury Township.  The northern terminus is at New York State Route 36 (NY 36) at the New York state line north of Knoxville.

Route description

PA 249 begins at an intersection with PA 287 in the community of Middlebury Center in Middlebury Township, heading northwest on a two-lane undivided road. The route passes through a mix of farmland and forested hills, turning west and running through Kenneyville. The road continues through agricultural areas with some homes, crossing into Chatham Township and passing through Shortsville. PA 249 winds west-northwest through a mix of farmland and woodland with occasional residential development, going through the community of Little Marsh. The road heads into more forested areas and continues west before turning northwest into a mix of farms and woods, entering Westfield Township. The route heads north through more rural areas with occasional homes, crossing the Cowanesque River and reaching an intersection with PA 49 in Phillips. Here, PA 249 turns northeast to form a concurrency with PA 49 on East Main Street, heading through farmland and woodland with some residences. The road briefly passes through Brookfield Township before heading into Deerfield Township. PA 249 splits from PA 49 to the west of the borough of Knoxville by heading north on an unnamed road, running to the west of Troups Creek. The road turns to the northwest and heads through more agricultural and wooded areas with some homes. PA 249 heads back into Brookfield Township as Troups Creek Road and passes through Austinburg before reaching its northern terminus at the New York border. At this point, the road continues into that state as NY 36.

History
The portion of PA 249 from PA 49 in Knoxville to the New York state line near Austinburg was originally designated as PA 149 from 1928 until 1946, when it was replaced by an extended PA 249.

Major intersections

See also

References

External links 

Pennsylvania Highways: PA 249

249
Transportation in Tioga County, Pennsylvania